Bidvey (also Romanized as Bīdvey) is a village in Soleyman Rural District, Soleyman District, Zaveh County, Razavi Khorasan Province, Iran. At the 2016 census, its population was 1,781, in 500 families.

References 

Populated places in Zaveh County